Keyhaven is a hamlet on the south coast of England in the county of Hampshire.  It is a fishing village, but the trade has been in decline for a period of years and its main draw now is tourism, especially sailing.

Overview
Keyhaven lies in the district of the New Forest and is just within the borders of the New Forest National Park. It is in the civil parish of Milford-on-Sea, and it lies at one end of the shingle bank known as Hurst Spit which leads to Hurst Castle. Keyhaven draws visitors through its outstanding natural beauty, from the views over the Solent to the abundance of open farm land. To the east of Keyhaven lies the nature reserve of Keyhaven marshes.

History
The name "Keyhaven" means ‘Harbour where cows are shipped’; OE cū (genitive cȳ) + hæfen. Cattle and sheep were transported from the Isle of Wight to the water meadows of the Avon around Christchurch.

Keyhaven was a port as early as 1206. There seem to have been two manorial estates here, one held by Bath Abbey, and the other by the Bishop of Salisbury. The lands of Bath Abbey were held by them until the time of the Dissolution, but in the 17th century it seems that the two manors were merged, and in 1802 the estate was purchased by Sir John D'Oyly. He subsequently sold it and by the 19th century it had passed, like other lands in the area, to William Cornwallis-West.

Like the rest of the West Solent area, a considerable salt industry developed soon after the Conquest. This had disappeared by 1400 but was revived in the 17th century with the introduction of new techniques.

In the 1930s a proposal was made to run a car ferry between Keyhaven and Fort Victoria on the Isle of Wight. An act of parliament was obtained in 1936 but a lack of funds meant the proposal was abandoned in 1938.

In 1976 there was a great fire on the marshes to the East side of Keyhaven River.  The fire nearly destroyed two bungalows on the marshes but was held back by the valiant efforts of many brave locals and Lymington Fire brigade.

Notes

External links 

Milford & Keyhaven News 
Walks 4 Softies
Milford on Sea guide, with information on Keyhaven
Local map of places to go, shops, restaurants, pubs in Milford, Lymington & surrounding areas.

Villages in Hampshire
Populated coastal places in Hampshire